Helen Elizabeth "Tess" Daly (born 29 March 1969) is an English model and television presenter who co-presented the BBC One celebrity dancing show Strictly Come Dancing from 2004 to 2013; she has been the show's main presenter since 2014.

Early life 
Daly was born on 29 March 1969 to textile-factory workers Felix James "Vivian" Daly (1932–2003), who died of emphysema, and Sylvia (née Bradley), and grew up in Birch Vale near New Mills, Derbyshire. She attended Hayfield Primary School and New Mills Secondary School, where she gained nine O-levels. She has a younger sister, Karen. Daly is of English and Irish descent.

Career

Modelling 
Daly was scouted outside a McDonald's restaurant while waiting for her sister in Manchester. When Daly began her modelling career, there was already a model named "Helen Daly" so she was asked to reconsider her name. Daly's agent was infatuated with Nastassja Kinski from the film Tess and told her that she should change her name to "Tess". Daly later recalled that she was "gullible and impressionable". She has not officially changed her name by deed poll because she thinks it would be disrespectful to her parents.

Six weeks after she turned 18 she undertook her first professional modelling job in Tokyo. After a series of work assignments across Asia and Europe while based in London, she was based in Paris for five years. She then returned to London for six months, before moving to New York for work for five years.

In 1990, Daly appeared in two Duran Duran videos for the songs "Serious" and "Violence of Summer (Love's Taking Over)", both from the album Liberty. She also appeared nude in the video for The Beloved's 1993 song "Sweet Harmony".

She was later the face of Danone Shape yogurt and also of lingerie company La Senza in the UK and appeared in their Steal the Show Christmas 2009 campaign.

Television 
While Daly was living on the Lower East Side in New York City, a friend who arranged red carpet events suggested that she interview the celebrity attendees. After buying a video camera, Daly's first interview was with New York-based Quentin Crisp, author of The Naked Civil Servant, who became a friend until his death. After a few red carpet interviews, in 2000, she sent a showreel to the producers of Channel 4's The Big Breakfast, who immediately contracted her to host the Find Me a Model competition. Since then, she has presented shows including Get Your Kit Off, Singled Out, Smash Hits TV, SMTV Live, Back To Reality and the first series of Make Me a Supermodel with Dave Berry.

In 2003, Daly replaced Ulrika Jonsson as presenter of ITV makeover show Home On Their Own, a show where children made their choice of alterations to their house during the course of a weekend, while their parents went on holiday. Some of the home improvements included an Austin Powers room, individual doorbells for the children and a cinema living room.

Daly has co-presented  BBC One's Strictly Come Dancing since 2004. She initially co-hosted the programme with Bruce Forsyth until he left the show in 2013; since 2014 she co-hosts with Claudia Winkleman. Daly missed the first half of the second series because she had recently given birth to her first daughter. Natasha Kaplinsky, the winner of the previous series, took her place for these episodes.

In January 2007, Daly and her husband Vernon Kay co-presented the second series of Just the Two of Us on BBC One.

Daly has also hosted This Time Tomorrow and the National Lottery show broadcast on BBC One. Since 2008, Daly has presented the BBC  telethon Children in Need with Terry Wogan and Fearne Cotton. She also won the special Children in Need version of Strictly Come Dancing against Terry Wogan, where she was partnered with Anton du Beke. On 17 December 2008, Daly co-hosted the Royal Variety Performance.

In November 2013, Daly guest-presented an episode of The One Show alongside Matt Baker. In early 2015, she co-hosted Strictly Come Dancing charity spin-off The People's Strictly for Comic Relief for BBC One. In 2015, Daly co-hosted Being Mum, a new show for AOL alongside Rochelle Humes.

In 2019, she played an unnamed character who hosts fictional TV show The Spotlight, in the CBBC drama: Almost Never.

Other work 
In 2011, Daly's first novel, The Camera Never Lies, a tale of love behind the scenes, was published by Coronet, an imprint of Hodder & Stoughton. It's Up to You New York, Daly's second book, was published in 2013.

In 2013, she became the new face of L'Oréal. In December 2017, Daly became the new face of Vitabiotics' Wellwoman supplement brand.

Personal life 
Daly married DJ and TV presenter Vernon Kay on 12 September 2003, at St Mary's Catholic Church in Horwich, near Bolton. Together, they have two daughters; Phoebe, born on 17 October 2004, and Amber, born on 30 May 2009. Daly and Kay live in Beaconsfield, Buckinghamshire.

Filmography

Television 

Guest appearances

 Shooting Stars (2002, 2011)
 Bo' Selecta! (2002)
 Davina (2006)
 The Paul O'Grady Show (2007)
 Celebrity Juice (2012, 2014)
 Would I Lie to You? (2012)
 8 Out of 10 Cats (2012, 2013)
 That Puppet Game Show (2013)
 Alan Carr: Chatty Man (2013)
 The Guess List (2014)
 Celebrity Squares (2015)
 Through the Keyhole (2015)
 Game of Talents (2021)
 RuPaul's Drag Race UK (2022)

References

External links 
 
 

Living people
20th-century English novelists
21st-century English novelists
English expatriates in France
English expatriates in the United States
English female models
English television presenters
People from New Mills
Strictly Come Dancing
1969 births